Groß Kummerfeld is a municipality in the Kreis (district) of Segeberg in Schleswig-Holstein, north Germany.

References

Municipalities in Schleswig-Holstein
Segeberg